These are the Billboard Holiday Songs number one hits from the chart's debut on December 8, 2001 until January 8, 2011.   The survey of radio airplay of Adult Contemporary and Adult Top 40 stations is published seasonally for 5-6 weeks after Thanksgiving.  When the Holiday 100 was launched on December 10, 2011, the chart was renamed Holiday Airplay.  Since December 4, 2010, only Brenda Lee's "Rockin' Around The Christmas Tree", Burl Ives' "A Holly Jolly Christmas", Jose Feliciano's "Feliz Navidad" (1970) and Mariah Carey's "All I Want for Christmas Is You" have alternated the #1 position.  Carey's "All I Want for Christmas Is You" has held the top position since December 30, 2017.

See also 
 Billboard Christmas Holiday Charts
 List of Billboard number one Holiday Digital Song Sales 2010-2019
 List of Billboard Top Holiday Albums number ones of the 2000s

References

External links 
 Current Top Holiday Airplay chart at Billboard

Billboard charts